Stagecoach West is an American Western television series about stagecoach drivers on the American frontier. It stars Wayne Rogers, Richard Eyer, and Robert Bray, and originally aired on ABC. It premiered on October 4, 1960 and ended on June 27, 1961, with a total of 38 episodes over the course of one season.

Synopsis
Luke Perry and Simon "Sime" Kane are veterans of the American Civil War who own and operate a stagecoach line on the American frontier. They share driving duties during stagecoach runs, and Sime′s courageous and resourceful son Davey often accompanies them on their trips. Based in the remote, unincorporated frontier town of Outpost in the Wyoming Territory, they have many adventures — involving murders, robberies, swindles, hijackings, range wars, and attacks by renegade Indians, renegade soldiers, and Mexican revolutionaries — during their stagecoach journeys as they transport passengers and baggage across the Old West. Although the characters never age, the events depicted in the episodes of Stagecoach West appear to take place at various times between the mid-1860s and the 1890s.

Dan Murchison is the kind and genial proprietor of the general store in Outpost, which also doubles as a bank. Zeke Bonner operates a way station called The Halfway House, at which Luke, Sime, and Davey′s stagecoach often makes a stop. Cal is the clerk in the stagecoach line′s office in the town of Timberline. Hugh Strickland is the United States Marshal in Timberline, and he eventually makes Luke and Sime deputy U.S. marshals. Doc Apperson is a physician whose practice includes the area where the stagecoach line operates. When the series begins, Davey has a dog named Hannibal; in Episode 6, it is announced that Hannibal has run away, but Davey adopts another dog from a stagecoach passenger, and the new dog becomes Hannibal II.

Cast

 Wayne Rogers as Luke Perry
 Richard Eyer as Davey Kane
 Robert Bray as Simon "Sime" Kane
 James Burke as Zeke Bonner
 John Litel as Dan Murchison
 Olan Soule as Cal
 Robert J. Stevenson as Marshal Hugh Strickland
 J. Pat O'Malley as Doc Apperson (two episodes)
 Sydney Smith as Doc Apperson (one episode)

Production

Four Star-Hilgarde produced Stagecoach West and Vincent M. Fennelly served as producer for the series. George Blair directed two episodes, and Harry Harris, Jr., directed one, and Donald McDougall or Thomas Carr directed the rest.

D.D. Beauchamp and Mary M. Beauchamp wrote many the episodes. Other episode writers included Bob Barbash, Martin Berkeley, Will C. Brown, John K. Butler, Roy Chanslor, Herman Epstein,  Kenneth Gammet, Ward Hawkins, Paul King, Frederick J. Lipp, Frank L. Moss, William D. Powell, John Robinson,  Joe Stone, and N. B. Stone, Jr.

Skip Martin and Terry Gilkyson composed the show's music. Bud & Travis sang the theme song over the closing credits.

Broadcast history

Stagecoach West premiered on October 4, 1960, and 38 episodes were produced. They aired on ABC on Tuesdays at 9:00 p.m. Eastern Time. The show was cancelled after a single season, and its last new episode was broadcast on June 27, 1961. Prime-time reruns of Stagecoach West then aired in its regular time slot until September 26, 1961.

Episodes

References

External links
 
 Stagecoach West opening and closing credits on YouTube

1960s American drama television series
1960 American television series debuts
1961 American television series endings
Black-and-white American television shows
American Broadcasting Company original programming
Television shows set in Wyoming
English-language television shows
1960s Western (genre) television series